Arthur Albert Kleinmeyer (1914 – December 23, 2000) was a Canadian curler. He played as second on the 1957 Brier-winning Team Alberta, skipped by Matt Baldwin. He was from Edmonton and worked for Imperial Oil. He began curling in Wainwright, Alberta.

References

1914 births
2000 deaths
Brier champions
Curlers from Alberta
People from Athabasca, Alberta
Canadian male curlers